Kaimakli (or  ) is a large northeastern suburb of Nicosia, Cyprus. Since 1968, it belongs to the Municipality of Nicosia. Its population in 2011 was 11,564.

Etymology
Kaimakli derives from the Turkish kaymak whose basic meaning is cream, especially clotted cream, and, by extension, the best of something. The term also applies to the froth on top of a cup of Turkish coffee. Rupert Gunnis states that the suburb took its name from a farm that produced clotted cream.

History
Kaimakli has two churches, Saint Barbara's and Archangel Michael's, which was also a cemetery. In St. Barbara there are some interesting old icons, e.g. one of Virgin Mary dated back to 1763.

In the 19th and 20th Century the inhabitants of Kaimakli where famed for their building and labouring skills. In 1878 when the British arrived, they found that the Venetians had diverted the river Pediaios north of the city, but the old riverbed still ran through the centre, creating an open sewer and rubbish dump, which sometimes flooded into the surrounding streets. In 1881 the riverbed was covered, the municipality offered ownership of the area covered to labourers prepared to undertake the work. Much of it was done by builders from Kaimakli who thus built Hermes Street. Many of the shops built were then given to builders as a reward for their labour.

The Cyprus Government Railway (Section 1) was constructed in 1905 and the line passed through Kaimakli towards Nicosia . A Station Halt and siding was then built in 1909 at the corner of what is now Synergasias Street and St. Hilarion. This formed part of the old line and the rail tracks are now buried within the tarmac. The Line and station closed on 31 December 1951. The Station was restored in 1995 and a Linear Park was constructed on over a kilometre of the old track.

Industry

The Regis Milk Industries, a major ice cream producer on the island, has its factory located at 1 Synergasias Street.

Sport
Achilleas is a Cypriot basketball club founded in 1943, nowadays running basketball, volleyball and table tennis divisions. It has been an integral part of the community in the suburb. The club is named after Achilles a legendary figure of the Greek mythology. Also, Kaimakli has three football teams: Omonoia Voreios, Polos Kaimakli and Morfotikos Kaimakli.

References

Suburbs of Nicosia
Neighbourhoods of Nicosia